ACF Fiorentina Youth Sector comprises the under-19 team and the academy of Italian professional football club ACF Fiorentina. The side currently compete in the Campionato Primavera 1, which they have won three times, and the Coppa Italia Primavera, which they won twice. Additionally, they have won the Supercoppa Primavera three times, most recently in 2022. The club has also taken part in the annual Torneo di Viareggio, an international tournament of which they are eight-time winners.

Primavera

Current squad

Current technical staff

Managerial history 

  Luciano Chiarugi (1993–1998)
  Luciano Bruni (1998–2004)
  Claudio Gabetta (2004–2005)
  Adriano Cadregari (2005–2007)
  Alberto Bollini (2007–2010)
  Leonardo Semplici (2011–2014)
  Federico Guidi (2014–2017)
  Emiliano Bigica (2017–2020)
  Alberto Aquilani (2020–present)

Honours 

 Campionato Nazionale Primavera: 3
 1970–71, 1979–80, 1982–83
 Coppa Italia Primavera: 4
 2018–19, 2019–20, 2020–21, 2021–22
 Supercoppa Primavera: 3
 2011, 2021, 2022
 Torneo di Viareggio: 8
 1966, 1973, 1974, 1978, 1979, 1982, 1988, 1992

Notable former youth team players 

The following is a list of players who have played in Fiorentina's Primavera squad and represented their country at full international level and/or have played regularly at a high-level club football. Players who are currently playing at Fiorentina, or for another club on loan from Fiorentina, are highlighted in bold.

  Tommaso Bellazzini
  Federico Bernardeschi
  Davide Brivio
  Gaetano Castrovilli
  Federico Chiesa
  Danilo D'Ambrosio
  Dario D'Ambrosio
  Enrique David Mateo
  Stefano Del Sante
  Samuel Di Carmine
  Alessandro Gherardi
  Filipe Gomes
  Lorenzo Paoli
  Luca Lezzerini
  Lorenzo Morelli
  Leonardo Pettinari
  Riccardo Sottil
  Massimiliano Tagliani
  Nicolò Zaniolo

References

External links 
 Official website 

ACF Fiorentina
Football clubs in Italy
Football academies in Italy
Football clubs in Tuscany